Vijayadasami may refer to:
 Vijayadashami, Hindu festival
Vijayadasami (film), 2007 Telugu film